"Farmer's Almanac" is a song written and originally recorded by Johnny Cash for his 1990 album Boom Chicka Boom.

Released in March 1990 as a single from that album, the song entered U.S. Billboard country airplay chart for one week at number 85.

Track listing

Charts

References

External links 
 "Farmer’s Almanac" on the Johnny Cash official website

Johnny Cash songs
Songs written by Johnny Cash
Song recordings produced by Bob Moore
1990 songs
1990 singles
Mercury Records singles